Kieran Doherty is a Northern Irish writer, TV format creator and Executive Producer. He is also the Joint Managing Director of Stellify Media, alongside his creative and business partner, Matthew Worthy. Doherty & Worthy have co-created multiple entertainment formats - including the international formats Secret Fortune and Take The Money and Run - while working for UK independent production company Wild Rover Productions. In 2014 Doherty & Worthy launched the production company Stellify Media as a joint venture with Sony Pictures Television.  Stellify Media is best known for successfully rebooting Who Wants to Be a Millionaire? with Jeremy Clarkson for ITV, and Blind Date with Paul O'Grady for Channel 5.

Doherty currently serves as PACT director for Northern Ireland and was the former Chair of the Royal Television Society Northern Ireland. He is on the steering committee for The Belfast Media Festival and is also a founding member of the Media Therapy Group, the largest media networking group in Ireland.


Career 
Doherty began his writing career in radio, writing two series of The Ulster Way for BBC Radio Ulster.

Production Credits

References 

Television writers from Northern Ireland
Irish television producers
Living people
Television editors from Northern Ireland
Year of birth missing (living people)